NHCC may refer to:
North Hennepin Community College
Lone Star College System (formerly North Harris County College)
New Hope Christian College
National Hispanic Cultural Center
North Hobart Cricket Club
National Housing and Construction Company, a Ugandan company